Kitione Salawa Jr. (born 23 May 2001) is a Fijian rugby union player, currently playing for the . His preferred position is lock.

Professional career
Salawa was named in the Fijian Drua squad for the 2022 Super Rugby Pacific season.

References

External links
itsrugby.co.uk Profile

2001 births
Living people
Fijian rugby union players
Rugby union flankers
Fijian Drua players